The 2014 Zenica mine disaster was a mining accident that occurred on 4 September 2014 at the coal mine "Raspotočje" in Zenica, Bosnia and Herzegovina.

Background

After a 3.5 Richter-scale earthquake hit Zenica on 4 September 2014, causing a rock burst in the coal mine "Raspotočje", 34 miners remained trapped inside the mine. All miners were trapped more than 500 meters below the surface, but were provided with fresh air.

Casualties

Out of the 34 miners who were trapped inside the mine, 5 were killed, while the remaining 29 were slightly injured.

References

Coal mining disasters in Bosnia and Herzegovina
Mining disasters in Bosnia and Herzegovina
2014 mining disasters
Zenica
2014 in Bosnia and Herzegovina
2014 disasters in Bosnia and Herzegovina